The Pistolet modèle An IX was a flintlock cavalry pistol, in service in French units from 1801.

The modèle An IX replaced the modèle 1777, which had been criticised to the point where the older modèle 1763 had been brought back into service.

The Pistolet modèle An IX was designed to equip mounted units, each horseman using two pistols. It was used in most mounted units of the Consulat and during the early years of the Empire, as well as in the Navy.

In 1806, the Pistolet modèle An XIII was introduced; the two system co-existed for some time, until the last modèles An IX were upgraded to the An XIII standard.

Sources and references 

 mle an IX.html Le pistolet de cavalerie de 17,1 mm modèle an IX

Firearms of France
Single-shot pistols
Black-powder pistols